Etiqueta Negra (Spanish for "Black Label") may refer to:
Etiqueta Negra (magazine)
BEHER (ham) products line Etiqueta Negra (Black Label): acorn-fed ham
Etiqueta Negra, album by Milly Quezada y los Vecinos
Etiqueta Negra, compilation album Nosequien y Los Nosecuantos
"Etiqueta negra", song by Patricio Rey y sus Redonditos de Ricota from Cordero Atado